Banking and Finance Academy (BFA) was established in 2010 by eight shareholding commercial banks of Mongolia and the bank training institute which operated under Central Bank of Mongolia merged with it in 2012. The shareholding banks were Trade and Development Bank (TDB), Golomt bank, Khan bank, National Investment bank, Erel bank, Chingis Khan Bank, and the State Bank.
The primary purpose of this Academy is to provide training services and certification for Mongolian banking and financial professionals and practitioners.

Training

Employees 
In 2023 BFA will have 10 employees.

Board members 
 Ganbyamba.Sh (Chairperson) – Vice president, Human resources, Khan Bank
 Enkhtaivan.G – Deputy governor of Bank of Mongolia
 Medree.B – President of Mongolian Bankers Association
 Odontungalag.B – Head, Public education and information department of Bank of Mongolia
 Markus Loch – Country representative, German Sparkassenstiftung Mongolia
 Enkhmend.A – Deputy CEO of Trade and Development Bank of Mongolia
 Namjilmaa.Ch – Director, Operation department of Capitron Bank

See also 
 Bank of Mongolia
 Mongolian Bankers Association

References

External links 
 

Banking in Mongolia
Educational organizations based in Mongolia